Diesel & Electric Loco Shed, Samastipur is an engine shed located in Samastipur, in the Indian state of Bihar. It is the smallest of the three locomotive sheds in the East Central Railway zone.

History 
The Railway Board sanctioned construction of Diesel Loco Shed, Samastipur in the year 1996–97. Construction began in 1999. The initial holding capacity was 20 locomotives, which were transferred from the Diesel Loco shed, Gonda.

Continuation 
Major and minor maintenance schedules of locomotives are carried out. The shed is ISO 9001:2000, ISO 14001:2004 and OHSAS 18001:2007 certified as or 2009. The shed is divided into Light Schedule Repair Section, Heavy Schedule Repair Section, Heavy Repair (Mechanical), Heavy Repair (Electrical), Bogie Section, Machine Shop and Training Centre.

Locomotives

References

External links 
 
 Central Railway - Official Website

SAMASTIPUR
Rail transport in Bihar

Transport in Samastipur
2001 establishments in Bihar